is a Japanese actress from Tokyo. She won the award for best newcomer at the 4th Yokohama Film Festival for Exchange Students. She was previously married to screenwriter Kōki Mitani.

Filmography
 I Are You, You Am Me (転校生; 1982)
 The Deserted City (廃市; 1983)
 Lonely Heart (さびしんぼう; 1985)
 Young Girls in Love (恋する女たち; 1986)
 Eien no 1/2 (1987)
 グリーン・レクイエム (Gurīn rekuiemu; 1988)
 Beijing Watermelon (北京的西瓜; 1989)
 やっぱり猫が好き　恩田三姉妹の京都大騒動編 (Video) (1990)
 Godzilla vs. Mothra (ゴジラＶＳモスラ; 1992)
 てなもんや商社　萬福貿易商社 (1998)
 やっぱり猫が好き　新作’98 (Video; 1998)
 キリコの風景 (1998)
 Sweet Sweet Ghost (スイート・スイート・ゴースト; 2000)
 やっぱり猫が好き　新作’2001 (Video; 2001)
 Ryoma's Wife, Her Husband and Her Lover (竜馬の妻とその夫と愛人; 2002)
 Kamome Shokudo (かもめ食堂; 2006) aka Ruokala lokki
 Megane (めがね; 2007)
 Tokyo Oasis (2011)
 Pale Moon (2014)
 Sing My Life (2016)
 After the Storm (2016)
 Family of Strangers (2019)
 Kiba: The Fangs of Fiction (2021)
 Tsuyukusa (2022)

Television
 Kinpachi-sensei (1979-80)
 Twinkle (きらきらひかる; 1998)
 Ren'ai kekkon no housoku (1999)
 Chūshingura 1/47(2001)
 Suika (2003)
 Kuruneko (くるねこ; 2009)
 Anone (2018)

Dubbing
 Last Night in Soho, Ms. Tobin (Elizabeth Berrington)
 Quiz, Claudia Rosencrantz (Aisling Bea)
 Yellowstone, Tate Dutton (Brecken Merrill)

References

External links
 
 

1965 births
Living people
Actresses from Tokyo